Ruby Gilbert (December 19, 1929 – February 28, 2010) was an American politician.

Gilbert was born in Childress, Texas and was raised in Dallas, Texas. In 1954, Gilbert moved to Wichita, Kansas and worked as a nurse's aide at Wesley Hospital in Wichita. Gilbert served in the Kansas House of Representatives from 1991 to 2004, from Wichita, and was the first African-American woman to be elected to the Kansas Legislature. Gilbert was appointed to the Kansas House of Representatives in 1991 to fill a vacancy and then was elected to the house in 1992. She was a Democrat. Gilbert died from cancer.

Notes

1929 births
2010 deaths
People from Childress, Texas
Politicians from Dallas
Politicians from Wichita, Kansas
Women state legislators in Kansas
African-American state legislators in Kansas
Democratic Party members of the Kansas House of Representatives
20th-century American women politicians
20th-century American politicians
21st-century American women politicians
21st-century American politicians
20th-century African-American women
20th-century African-American politicians
21st-century African-American women
21st-century African-American politicians